|}

This is a list of Legislative Council results for the Victorian 1970 state election. 18 of the 36 seats were contested.

Results by province

Ballarat

Bendigo

Boronia

Doutta Galla 

 Two party preferred vote was estimated.

East Yarra 

 Two party preferred vote was estimated.

Gippsland

Higinbotham

Melbourne 

 Two party preferred vote was estimated.

Melbourne North 

 Two party preferred vote was estimated.

Melbourne West 

 Two party preferred vote was estimated.

Monash

Northern

North Eastern

North Western

South Eastern

South Western

Templestowe

Western

See also 

 1970 Victorian state election
 Candidates of the 1970 Victorian state election
 Members of the Victorian Legislative Council, 1970–1973

References 

Results of Victorian state elections
1970s in Victoria (Australia)